Patrickson Luiggy Delgado Villa (born 17 October 2003) is an Ecuadorian footballer who plays as a midfielder for Jong Ajax, on loan from Independiente del Valle.

Career

Club career

Before the second half of 2021–22, Delgado was sent on loan to Dutch side Jong Ajax. On 11 March 2022, he debuted for Jong Ajax during a 3–3 draw with FC Dordrecht.

International career

He represented Ecuador at the 2019 FIFA U-17 World Cup.

References

External links
 

2003 births
Association football midfielders
C.S.D. Independiente del Valle footballers
Ecuador youth international footballers
Ecuadorian expatriate footballers
Ecuadorian expatriate sportspeople in the Netherlands
Ecuadorian footballers
Ecuadorian Serie B players
Eerste Divisie players
Expatriate footballers in the Netherlands
Jong Ajax players
Living people
People from Ibarra, Ecuador